This is a list of the first minority male lawyer(s) and judge(s) in Arizona. It includes the year in which the men were admitted to practice law (in parentheses). Also included are other distinctions such as the first minority men in their state to graduate from law school or become a political figure.

Firsts in Arizona's history

Lawyers 

 First Hispanic American male: Joseph C. Padilla (1936)
 First Asian American male: Wing F. Ong (1943): 
 First African American male: Hayzel B. Daniels (1948) 
 First Native American (Pascua Yaqui Tribe) male: Lawrence Huerta (1953) 
 First Native American (Gila River Indian Community) male: Rodney B. Lewis (1972) 
 First undocumented male: Daniel Rodriguez in 2014

State judges 

First Jewish American male: Charles Bernstein (1929) in 1946 
First Mexican American male (Superior Court of Arizona): Raúl Héctor Castro (1949) in 1959
 First African American male: Hayzel B. Daniels (1948) in 1965
 First Hispanic American male (Arizona Appeals Court): Joe W. Contreras in 1979 
First African American male (Arizona Appeals Court): Cecil B. Patterson Jr. (1971) in 1985 

Federal judges 

First Asian American male (U.S. Court of Appeals for the Ninth Circuit in Arizona): Thomas Tang (1950) in 1977
First Hispanic American male (U.S. District Court): Valdemar Aguirre Cordova (1950) in 1979 
First African American male (Chief Judge; U.S. District Court): Raner Collins (1975) in 2013

Attorney General of Arizona 

 First African American male (work for Attorney General): Cecil B. Patterson Jr. (1971) 
 First Jewish American male: Tom Horne (1970) from 2011-2015

Assistant Attorneys General 

 First Hispanic American male: Albert García (1937) 
First African American male: Hayzel B. Daniels (1948)

County Attorney 

 First Mexican American male: Raúl Héctor Castro (1949) from 1954-1959

Political office 

First Mexican American male (Governor of Arizona): Raúl Héctor Castro (1949) from 1975-1977

Firsts in local history 
 Greg Garcia: Reputed to be the first Hispanic American male lawyer in Maricopa County, Arizona
 Cecil B. Patterson Jr. (1971): First African American male to serve on the Maricopa County Superior Court
 Kevin Kane: First openly LGBT male to serve on the Phoenix Municipal Court (2006)
 Raúl Héctor Castro (1949): First Mexican American male to serve on the Superior Court of Pima County, Arizona (1959)
 James Don: First Chinese American male to serve as the Pinal County Attorney and a Judge of the Pinal County Superior Court, Arizona

See also 

 List of first minority male lawyers and judges in the United States

Other topics of interest 

 List of first women lawyers and judges in the United States
 List of first women lawyers and judges in Arizona

References 

 
Minority, Arizona, first
Minority, Arizona, first
Arizona lawyers